Mordechai Breuer (1918–2007) was a German-Jewish historian and writer.

Background and Family
Breuer was born in Frankfurt am Main (Germany) to Isaac Breuer and his wife Jenny Breuer (née Eisenmann) in 1918. He had four siblings: Yaakov; Ulla, Tzipora, and Simeon. The family originated in Frankfurt but left for Israel in 1936.

Work
Breuer wrote extensively on history, particularly German Jewish history. His works include Modernity Within Tradition: The Social History of Orthodox Jewry in Imperial Germany, (Columbia University Press: 1992) and The Torah-im-Derekh-Eretz of S.R. Hirsch (1970).

References 

 German-Jewish history in modern times, Volume 1, By Michael A. Meyer, Mordechai Breuer, Michael Graetz
 Marc B. Shapiro, Obituary for Professor Mordechai Breuer zt”l, the Seforim Blog
 פיוטים בביצועו, מתוך אתר "פיוט"

1918 births
2007 deaths
20th-century Israeli historians
Jewish historians
Jewish emigrants from Nazi Germany to Mandatory Palestine
German people of Hungarian-Jewish descent
Writers from Frankfurt
Burials at the Jewish cemetery on the Mount of Olives
20th-century German historians